The Syracuse Spirit was a member of the American Lacrosse League, a short lived professional lacrosse league in 1988, based in Syracuse, New York. The Spirit played their home games at the Griffin Field in Liverpool, New York. The general manager of the Spirit was Tom Scofield  and the head coach was Jim Booth.

The Spirit had a 4–1 record when the league folded.

Results and statistics
April 24, 1988
Syracuse 13 @ Long Island 17
Long 3-0, Korrie 3-2, Nelson 3-2, Perkins 3-3, Tarbell 0-1, Guy 1-0
Saves: Solomon 9, Warren 10 

May 1, 1988
Syracuse 17 @ New Jersey 15
Long 2-1, Korrie 3-1, Nelson 3-1, van Arsdale 3-2, Perkins 2-0, Lundblad 1-0, Jeschke 1-1 Guy 1-0
Saves: Warren 16 

May 8, 1988
Syracuse 19 @ Baltimore 13
Long 3-2, Korrie 7-0, Nelson 1-1, Perkins 3-1, Tarbell 2-0, Rosa 1-0, Desko 1-0, Burnham 1-0, Long 0-3, Lucas 0-1, McKee 0-1
Saves: Warren 17

May 15, 1988
Boston 15 @ Syracuse 20
Rosa 4-0, Korrie 5-2, Nelson 3-3, Perkins 1-0, Long 2-0
Saves: Solomon 21

May 21, 1988
New Jersey 13 @ Syracuse 26
Guy 3-5, Korrie 6-1, Donahue 3-1, Desko 1-0
Saves:

Roster

References

Lacrosse teams in New York (state)
Lacrosse in Syracuse, New York
1988 in sports in New York (state)